Bernhard Eichhorn (17 April 1904 – 6 February 1980) was a German composer, who produced a number of film scores.

Biography
Eichhorn was born in Schortewitz. In 1927, he joined the Universität und Akademie für Tonkunst in Munich, under Arthur Kutscher. In 1927/28, he was Korrepetitor at the Bavarian State Opera and afterwards Kapellmeister at the Bayerische Landesbühne. From 1934 to 1944, he was music director at the Staatstheater Dresden. From 1945 to 1947, Eichhorn was  Kapellmeister at the Städtische Bühnen München. Since then, he lived as a freelance composer for film, radio, television and the stage.

He died in Miesbach.

Selected filmography

 Anuschka (1942)
 Doctor Crippen (1942)
 Under the Bridges (1946)
 In Those Days (1947)
 The Time with You (1948)
 The Orplid Mystery (1950)
 Royal Children (1950)
 The Violin Maker of Mittenwald (1950)
 The Cloister of Martins (1951)
 White Shadows (1951)
 House of Life (1952)
 The Monastery's Hunter (1953)
 Hubertus Castle (1954)
 Rose-Girl Resli (1954)
 The Silent Angel (1954)
 The Dark Star (1955)
 Sky Without Stars (1955)
 Lost Child 312 (1955)
 The Vulture Wally (1956)
 The Girl from Flanders (1956)
 The Captain from Köpenick (1956)
 Love From Paris (1957)
 Iron Gustav (1958)
 Jons und Erdme (1959)
 The Goose of Sedan (1959)
 A Glass of Water (1960)
 The Good Soldier Schweik (1960)
 The Dream of Lieschen Mueller (1961)
 Blind Justice (1961)

Bibliography

References

External links

1904 births
1980 deaths
People from Saxony-Anhalt
20th-century German composers